Botsis is a Greek surname. It can refer to:
 Botsis family of publishers, owners of the Greek newspaper Apogevmatini
 Ivan Botsis (died 1714), Greek-born Russian admiral

See also
 Votsis

Greek-language surnames
Surnames